2-Aminobiphenyl (2-APB) is an organic compound with the formula C6H5C6H4NH2. It is an amine derivative of biphenyl. It is a colorless solid, although aged samples can appear colored even black. Palladacycles obtained from 2-aminobiphenyl are popular catalysts for cross-coupling.

It is prepared by hydrogenation of 2-nitrobiphenyl.

See also
 4-Aminobiphenyl
 Herrmann's catalyst

References

Anilines
Biphenyls